Familie Schölermann is a German television series.

External links
 

1950s German television series
1954 German television series debuts
1960 German television series endings
German-language television shows
Das Erste original programming